Prince Kita (Ivane) Abashidze (16 January 1870 – 17 December 1917) was a Georgian literary critic, journalist, and politician.

Abashidze was born into a noble family in the province of Guria. Having graduated from Kutaisi Classic Gymnasium (1889), he attended the lectures in philosophy and art theory in Paris and studied law at the Odessa University (1890–1895). Later in the 1890s, he worked for the Tiflis control chamber, and then as an arbitrator in Racha and Chiatura in western Georgia. From 1893 onward, he engaged in journalism and regularly wrote literary criticism for Georgian press. His aesthetics and views on the contemporary Georgian and world literature were shaped under the influence of the Georgian intellectuals of the 1860s and the French critic Ferdinand Brunetière.

In the early 1900s, Abashidze was involved in the management of Chiatura manganese industry, and later chaired the Manganese Industry Council. He also joined the Georgian Socialist-Federalist Revolutionary Party and became one of its leaders. After the fall of the Imperial Russian government in the 1917 February Revolution, Abashidze was appointed a commissar for education within the Special Transcaucasian Committee ("Ozakom"), a provisional regional administration, being the only Georgian member of this body at its outset. In March 1917, he was replaced in the Ozakom with the Social-Democrat Akaki Chkhenkeli.

References 

1870 births
1917 deaths
Burials at Didube Pantheon
People from Guria
People from Kutais Governorate
Journalists from Georgia (country)
Literary critics from Georgia (country)
Politicians from Georgia (country)
Nobility of Georgia (country)
20th-century deaths from tuberculosis
Members of the Grand Orient of Russia's Peoples
Tuberculosis deaths in Georgia (country)